Cyperus tenerrimus is a species of sedge that is native to southern parts of North America, Central America and northern parts of South America.

The species was first formally described by the botanists Carl Borivoj Presl and Jan Svatopluk Presl in 1828.

See also 
 List of Cyperus species

References 

tenerrimus
Plants described in 1828
Flora of Mexico
Flora of Bolivia
Flora of Costa Rica
Flora of Colombia
Flora of Venezuela
Flora of Panama
Flora of Nicaragua
Flora of Honduras
Flora of Guatemala
Flora of El Salvador
Taxa named by Jan Svatopluk Presl
Taxa named by Carl Borivoj Presl